Thomas Jenkins (1801–1866) was a member of the Wisconsin State Assembly.

Biography
Jenkins was born in March 1801. Later, he settled in what is now Dodgeville, Wisconsin. During the Black Hawk War, Jenkins fought under the command of Henry Dodge. He was wounded in the hip during the Battle of Horseshoe Bend (1832). Jenkins died in 1866.

Political career
Jenkins was a member of the Assembly in 1848. Previously, he had been a member of the Legislature of the Wisconsin Territory and a delegate to the constitutional convention to write the Constitution of Wisconsin. He was a Democrat.

References

People from Dodgeville, Wisconsin
Democratic Party members of the Wisconsin State Assembly
Members of the Wisconsin Territorial Legislature
American people of the Black Hawk War
1801 births
1866 deaths
19th-century American politicians